Molly Hatchet is an American Southern rock band from Jacksonville, Florida. Originally formed in 1971 by guitarist Dave Hlubek and Tim Lindsey bassist [Mind Garden], the group's early years were characterized by regular personnel changes and sporadic performances, with no stable lineup in place. By 1976, the band Molly Hatchet had been officially reformed with a lineup of Hlubek, Steve Holland and Duane Roland on guitars, Danny Joe Brown on vocals, Banner Thomas on bass and Bruce Crump on drums. The current lineup of Molly Hatchet includes keyboardist John Galvin (who originally joined in 1984), guitarist Bobby Ingram (since 1987), drummer Shawn Beamer (since 2001), bassist Tim Lindsey (since 2004) and vocalist Jimmy Elkins (since 2019).

History

1971–1995
Molly Hatchet was originally founded by guitarist Dave Hlubek in 1971. During its early years, the band performed with various musicians in the Jacksonville area, not settling on an official lineup. Early members of the group included vocalist Bobby Maddox, guitarist Donald Hall, and drummer Fred Bianco. Hlubek also performed vocals during certain periods of the band's formation. By the spring of 1976, the group had settled on a lineup including Hlubek and Holland, bassist Banner Thomas (who joined in 1973), drummer Bruce Crump (who joined in early 1976), third guitarist Duane Roland and vocalist Danny Joe Brown (both of whom joined in 1976). Brown joined from Rum Creek, which featured future Danny Joe Brown Band and Molly Hatchet guitarist Bobby Ingram.

After the release of Molly Hatchet and Flirtin' with Disaster, Brown left Molly Hatchet in 1980 due to problems with diabetes, with Jimmy Farrar taking his place. Beatin' the Odds and Take No Prisoners followed, after which Thomas also left in November 1981 following an argument with Hlubek. He was replaced by Ralph "Riff" West. The following year, Crump moved to Los Angeles, California and was replaced by Barry "B.B." Borden. In May, Brown returned to replace Farrar and the group released No Guts... No Glory in 1983. By 1984, Crump had returned and keyboardist John Galvin – a former member of the Danny Joe Brown Band who contributed keyboard parts to No Guts... No Glory as a guest performer – had joined the band full-time, after Holland grew tired of touring and left the band.

The new two-guitarist lineup released The Deed Is Done in 1984, followed by Double Trouble Live in 1985, before Hlubek left the band at the beginning of 1987 in order to address his ongoing problem with drug addiction. He was replaced by Bobby Ingram, another alumnus of the Danny Joe Brown Band. After releasing and touring in promotion of Lightning Strikes Twice, Molly Hatchet played its last show in July 1990 before Roland, West, Crump and Galvin all left. Brown and Ingram subsequently rebuilt the group later in the year, touring for another five years with various personnel.

1995–2017
In April 1995, Danny Joe Brown was forced to leave Molly Hatchet again due to ongoing health problems. He was replaced by Phil McCormack, who had earlier substituted for Brown during a tour in 1992. The group's new lineup – which also included guitarist Bryan Bassett, bassist Andy McKinney, drummer Mac Crawford and former keyboardist John Galvin – returned to the studio and released Devil's Canyon in 1996. This was followed in 1998 by Silent Reign of Heroes, which also featured contributions from keyboardist Tim Donovan, who had filled in for Galvin during several recent touring cycles. Sean Shannon replaced Crawford in 1999.
This was the last three guitar line up of Molly Hatchet.

After the release of Kingdom of XII in 2000, guitarist Bryan Bassett was replaced by Russ Maxwell. The band recorded the double live album Locked and Loaded before the end of the year, although it was not released until 2003. Further lineup changes followed during the band's touring the following year, as Shannon was replaced in September 2001 by Dale Rock, who then made way for Shawn Beamer the next month. McKinney also left in February 2002 and was replaced by Jerry Scott, shortly before Ingram took a short break from touring after suffering a heart attack, and the band continued with only Maxwell on guitar. Scott was replaced by Tim Lindsey took over in February 2003 [Mind Garden, Rossington Band, Lynyrd Skynyrd . Maxwell left the next month, with Jake Rutter taking his place.

In January 2005 founding member Dave Hlubek returned to Molly Hatchet for the first time in 18 years. The guitarist's touring appearances were limited due to his ongoing health issues, October 31, 2005 |accessdate=July 11, 2019 |url-status=live }}</ref> During the 2000s and 2010s, many former members of the band died – vocalist Danny Joe Brown on March 10, 2005 due to kidney failure and pneumonia caused by his diabetes, guitarist Duane Roland on June 19, 2006 due to natural causes, bassist Riff West on November 19, 2014 due to health complications caused by a car accident several months earlier, drummer Bruce Crump on March 16, 2015 after a lengthy battle with throat cancer, and bassist Banner Thomas on April 10, 2017 due to a heart attack following a bout of pneumonia.

2017 onwards
On September 2, 2017 guitarist Dave Hlubek died of a heart attack. The group continued to perform with just one guitarist, as Ingram stated that he "could never" replace Hlubek. On October 29, 2018, former vocalist Jimmy Farrar died due to complications from congestive heart failure, kidney failure and liver failure. Molly Hatchet continued to tour until Phil McCormack died on April 25, 2019. Jimmy Elkins took his place and was officially announced as the band's new vocalist in October 2019. Steve Holland, the last original member of the group, died on August 2, 2020.

Members

Current

Former

Backup

Timeline

Lineups

References

External links
Official website

Molly Hatchet